Apollodorus (fl. 1st century AD) was an ancient Macedonian runner who, after winning in the Olympics, was killed by lightning on his way back home. He is commemorated by Antipater of Thessalonica in the below epigram (Greek Anthology 7.390):

Every year the Race of Apollodoros is organized in modern Aiani and Veria (Greece).

References
Greek Anthology, 7.390.
Veroia
Archaeological Museum of Aiane

1st-century deaths
Ancient Greek runners
Ancient Macedonian athletes
Roman-era Olympic competitors
1st-century Greek people
Roman-era Macedonians
Deaths from lightning strikes
Year of birth unknown